Armored Fist is a video game developed and published by Novalogic for the PC. It was followed by Armored Fist 2 and Armored Fist 3.

Gameplay
Armored Fist is a tank simulation and strategy game involving both US and Soviet armed forces.

Reception

Next Generation reviewed the game, rating it four stars out of five, and stated that the game was "Charming cold war fun." Power Play was disappointed by the game's weak overall visual design.

Reviews
Computer Gaming World (Jan, 1995)
MikroBitti - Dec, 1994
PC Games - Dec, 1994
PC Gamer - Feb, 1995

References

External links
 Armored Fist at MobyGames

1994 video games
DOS games
DOS-only games
Embracer Group franchises
NovaLogic games
Single-player video games
Tank simulation video games
Video games developed in the United States
Video games with voxel graphics